ESPN NBA 2Night is a video game developed and published by Konami for Dreamcast and PlayStation 2 in 2000-2001. A sequel, ESPN NBA 2Night 2002, was released in 2002 for the PlayStation 2 and Xbox.

Reception

The PS2 version received "mixed" reviews, while the Dreamcast version received "unfavorable" reviews, according to the review aggregation website Metacritic. Rob Smolka of NextGen said that the latter console version was "Only recommended for those who demand to listen to a repetitious Stuart Scott supplying the color commentary." GamePro gave the former console version a mixed review, a few weeks before its U.S. release.

References

External links
 

2000 video games
Dreamcast games
ESPN video games
Konami games
National Basketball Association video games
PlayStation 2 games
Video games developed in Japan
Video games set in 2000
Video games set in the United States